, abbreviated as Nagaoka Gidai, is a national technology university founded in 1976 in Nagaoka, Niigata, Japan. It is one of only two Universities of Technology, a form of university in Japan, the other being  Toyohashi University of Technology in Aichi. Many students from colleges of technology, a 5-year college called "kosen" in Japan have enrolled. The university requires 4th year students to spend up to five months on-the-job experience (internship) in private enterprises, government agencies, and elsewhere. Having a high employment rate in the national universities in Japan.

Organization

Faculty
School of Engineering
Mechanical Engineering
Electrical, Electronics and Information Engineering
Materials Science and Technology
Civil Engineering
Environmental Systems Engineering
Bioengineering
Management and Information Systems Engineering

Graduate School of Engineering
Master's Program
Mechanical Engineering
Electrical, Electronics and Information Engineering
Material Science & Technology
Civil Engineering
Environmental System Engineering
Bio-engineering
Management and Information Systems Engineering
Nuclear System Safety Engineering
Doctoral Program
Information Science and Control Engineering
Materials Science
Energy and Environment Science
Integrated Bio-science and Technology
5-years Doctoral Program
Science of Technology Innovation

Graduate School of Management of Technology
Professional Degree Course
System Safety

Research and Faculty Programs
The 21st Century Center Of Excellence Program (MEXT)
Creation of Hybridized Materials with Super-Functions and Formation of International Research & Education Center (2002–2006)
Global Renaissance by Green Energy Revolution (2003–2007)
Support Program for Contemporary Educational Needs (MEXT)
Development of cyclical education that incorporates Geen Technology practices
Program for Promoting High-Quality University Education (MEXT)
Practical Meister system of technological education
Restructuring of Fundamental Engineering Education based on Universal Design Concept

History

1976  Nagaoka University of Technology was opened
1978  Matriculation ceremony of the first undergraduate class was held
1980  Graduate School (Master's program) was established
1986  Graduate School of Engineering (Doctoral program) was established
2000  Course was reorganized
2006  Integrated Bioscience and Technology course (Doctoral program) and System Safety (Professional Degree Course) was established
2012 Nuclear System Safety Engineering course (Master's program) was established
2015 Science of Technology Innovation (5-years Doctoral program) was established

Research and Instructional Centers

Center for Faculty Development
Center for General Education
Language Center
Physical Education and Health Care Center
Analysis and Instrumentation Center
Technology Development Center
Center for Machining Technology Development
Extreme Energy-Density Research Institute
Center for International Exchange and Education
Center for e-Learning Research and Application
Information Processing Center
Radioisotope Center
Sound and Vibration Engineering Center
Center for Science and Mathematics
Center for Multimedia System
Techno-Incubation Center
Research Center for Advanced Magnesium Technology
Center for Green-Tech Development in Asia
Research Center for Safe and Secure Society
Advanced Methane-Utilization Research Center
Gigaku Innovation Promotion Center
Intellectual Property Center
Top Runner Incubation Center for Academia-Industry Fusion
Center for Integrated Technology Support (CITS)

Presidents
Kawakami Masamitsu
Saito Shinroku
Kanno Masayoshi
Uchida Yasuzo
Hattori Ken
Kojima Yo
Niihara Koichi
Azuma Nobuhiko

Location
Located in the suburb area of Nagaoka City in Niigata Prefucture, nearby the Echigo Hillside Park (national government park).
By taxi about 20 minutes, By bus about 30min from Nagaoka Station (about 1 hour 40 minutes from Tokyo Station by Joetsu Shinkansen, Japanese bullet train)
By car about 5 minutes from the Nagaoka Interchange on the Kan-etsu Expressway.

External links

References

Japanese national universities
Universities and colleges in Niigata Prefecture
Engineering universities and colleges in Japan
Buildings and structures in Nagaoka, Niigata
1976 establishments in Japan
Educational institutions established in 1976